Pilot Mound Township may refer to:

Pilot Mound Township, Boone County, Iowa
Pilot Mound Township, Fillmore County, Minnesota
Pilot Mound Township, Griggs County, North Dakota, in Griggs County, North Dakota

Township name disambiguation pages